Almendra is a civil parish in the municipality of Vila Nova de Foz Côa, Portugal.

See also 
 Fregeneda–Almendra pegmatitic field

Freguesias of Vila Nova de Foz Côa